William Rugge (also Rugg, Repps, Reppes; died 1550) was an English Benedictine theologian, and bishop of Norwich from 1536 to 1549.

Life
He was born in Northrepps, Norfolk.

He was a Doctor of Divinity of Gonville Hall, Cambridge in 1513. The Carthusian Thomas Spencer (died 1529) wrote A Trialogus between Thomas Bilney, Hugh Latimer and William Repps, in which Rugge appears to balance two reformers.

He became Abbot of St Benet's Abbey in 1530. He retained the abbey in commendam on being appointed bishop of Norwich; the community there was suppressed in 1539.

He was one of the authors of The Bishops' Book of 1537. A theological conservative, he was one of the group trying, without success, to have the Book include material defending pilgrimages. He disputed publicly with Robert Watson, an early evangelical Protestant, in 1539, on the topic of free will.

Resignation
He resigned his diocese in 1549. Reasons given are financial problems, and royal anger at his sloth in opposing Kett's Rebellion (which may have amounted to sympathy). Gilbert Burnet claimed that the see was needed as place to move Thomas Thirlby, bishop of Westminster, so that Nicholas Ridley could be translated from Rochester, to become bishop of London. Rugge had in fact long been a thorn in Thomas Cranmer's flesh, and after Kett was put down he was eased out in disgrace, but pardoned and pensioned off.

Family
"The family of Rugg, took their name from a lordship, or hamlet in the town of Pattingham in Staffordshire, and were of good degree and eminency; (fn. 7) the younger branch came into Norfolk: in the 49th of Edward III. Nicholas Rugg, second son of John Rugg, of Rugg, seated himself there, and was father of Clement Rugge, who was living in the 12th of Henry IV. his son William was father of Thomas Rugge, who occurs in the 23d of Henry VI.; and left Robert Rugge of North Repps, his son and heir, in the 2d of Edward IV. father of William, whose son Robert lived in the 1st of Edward V. and was father of William, of North Repps, Gent."

William Rugge, abbot and bishop, was the son of William Rugge (d.1512) of Northrepps and Agnes – who had four sons, Nicholas, Roger, William, Bishop of Norwich, and Robert.

Children of William Rugge and Agnes:

 William Rugge alias Repps, Bishop of Norwich 28 Henry VIII
 Roger Rugge, m. Alice Ederyke, and had: 
 Alice, wife of Rob. Fayer
 Margaret, wife of Gybsonn
 Thomas, died without issue
 Nicholas Rugge, who married Elizabeth and had;
 Dorothy, wife of Robert Playford
 Margaret, wife of Kervyll
 Robert Rugge, Mayor of Norwich

The Bishop's much younger brother, Robert Rugge (by 1503 – 18 February 1558/9), of Norwich in Norfolk, was an English politician.  «In the 24th of Henry VIII. William Rugge, abbot of St. Bennet's conveyed the manor of Greengate to Robert Rugge, his brother, alderman of Norwich, which the said Robert held in 1558, with that of Spicer's alias Berd's, in Hoveton St. John, and St. Peter, Tunstead, Belaugh, and Ashmanhaugh; the last sold to him also by the late abbot, his brother.» Robert m. 1) Elizabeth, daughter of Robert Wood of Norwich, gentleman of the horse to Charles Brandon, Duke of Suffolk, they had 5 sons and 3 daughters; 2) Alice (d.1566), daughter of William Wayte of Tittleshall, widow of William Hare of Beeston. He made his will on 24 December 1558 and died on the following 18 February. He gave his wife Alice a life interest in certain lands and a house, furnishings and plate, and divided the remaining lands between his elder sons William and Francis. The executors were William and Francis Rugge. He had two sons-in-law, Robert Flint and George Thimblethorpe.

Children of Robert Rugge (d.1558/9) and Elizabeth Wood:

 William of Felmingham in Norfolk
 Robert, Archdeacon of Suffolk. He matriculated sizar from Trinity, Cambridge at Michaelsmas 1547.
John Rugge (d.February 1581/2), 3rd son, Achdeacon of Wells, who married Jane Brune, the daughter of Sir John Brune (d.1559) and Jane Bampfield. He matriculated pens. from Trinity, Cambridge at Michaelsmas 1548. When his father made his will on Christmas Eve 1558, John was a priest who had gone into exile under Mary, spending some time in Italy with Thomas Wyndham. His father left him £4 a year, with the proviso that if on his return he remained in the ministry this should be exchanged for the advowson of the archdeaconry of Sudbury.
 Philip, s.p.
 Francis Rugge, 4th son (1535–1607), was Freeman, Norwich 1563, alderman from c.1570, sheriff 1572-3, and Mayor of Norwich 1587-8, 1598-9, 1602-3. He was the son of Robert Rugge by Elizabeth, daughter of Robert Wood, and married Anne, daughter of John Aldrich (by 1520–1582) and Elizabeth, daughter of Nicholas Sotherton, alderman of Norwich, on 14 June 1561 at Norwich. Anne had previously been married to Nicholas Bacon (d.1560), on 19 February 1559 at Saint Clement in Norwich. Rugge’s elder brothers became landed gentlemen or clerics, while he inherited his father’s position as a Norwich mercer. He was also left two manors and some money and plate on his father’s death in 1559. Children of Francis Rugge and Anne Aldrich:
 Robert, baptised on 12 July 1562, buried on 21 July 1562 at St. Clement's Church, Norwich
 Jone, a daughter, baptised at home in January 1563/4 in Norwich by the midwife, buried on 22 January 1563/4 at St. George Colegate, Norwich, Norfolk, England
 Dyones (also spelled Dyonise or Dyonice), who married George Thimblethorpe
 Elizabeth, who married Robert Flint of Norwich

William Rugge (d.1616), Esq. son of Robert, was heir to his uncle, the Bishop, and lived in Brian's Manor in Felmingham in Norfolk, as did his son Thomas, whom he had by his wife Thomasyne.  William Rugge, Esq. was lord of North Repps in 1572, and married Thomasine, daughter of Sir Robert Townshend of Guiest, Justice of Chester, and the widow of William Curson of Beckhall and Bilingford. Children of William Rugge and Thomasine Townsend:

 Thomas, who married Bridget Pennell of St. Margaret, Westminster, spinster, at St. Mary, Westminster, on 8 February 1607/8.  Thomas matriculated Fell.-Com. from Trinity c. 1595. Bridget was the daughter of William Pencell of Lyndreth in Worcester. Children of Thomas Rugge and Bridget Pennell:
 Robert, matriculated Fell.-Com. from Corpus Christi at Easter 1626. He was probably the Robert Rugge who on 6 November 1634 at Bergh Apton married Constance Tayler, the daughter of  Henry Taylor (d.1650), a justice of the peace and lord of Hardingham Hall, and had by her a son and three daughters. Constance survived Robert, and as his widow remarried twice. She married 2) John Cowper of Reymerston on 19 October 1654 at Reymerston, Norwich in Norfolk; 3) by 1658 Thomas le Hunt, and had by him a son, George Hunt. About 1713 George le Hunt of New Bukenham is said to have a 4th part of the lordship of Hardingham. He married Mary Hart on 21 December the same year, 1713, at Bunwell in Norwich. Mary, his wife, who died June 30, 1721, aged 51 years, lies buried in Shropham, Breckland Borough, Norfolk. Ambrose Meers of Easton by Norwich is said to have the other 3 parts of Hardingham in 1713. Around 1680 it appears that John Meres of London, Gent., John Palgrave, Esq. and Richard Parker, had a right in Hardingham. Thomas Rugge mortgaged the manor of Northrepps to John Palgrave in 1667. There is an altar tomb on the south side in the churchyard of Carleton Rode in Norfolk for Thomas le Hunt, Esq. son of Sir George le Hunt of little Bradley in Suffolk, 2 January 1703, and Margaret, his relict, 6 November 1716. George Le Hunt late of New Bukenham was buried at Carleton Rode on 5 February 1721/2. Three children can be found baptised to Thomas Le Hunt and his wife Margaret. Elizabeth Le Hunt baptised on 17 January 1669/70 at Flordon, George Le Hunt, born on 30 April 1672, baptised on 14 May 1672 at Carleton Rode, and Tabitha born on 30 November 1674, baptised on 15 December 1674 at Carleton Rode, who married Christopher Browne, gentleman, on 5 February 1713 at Bunwell. The entry for her marriage is the one directly preceding the entry of her brother's marriage. While it was not unusual in the period to start over again and give the children of the second marriage the same Christian names as the children of the first marriage (or even more rarely, sometimes even giving the children from the same marriage the same Christian name), the possibility that there was only ever one son born to this Thomas Le Hunt named George, and that he was the son of Margaret, not Constance, must be considered. Constance, the wife of Thomas Le Hunt, Esquire, was buried on 16 January 1662/3 at Reymerston, Norwich in Norfolk, perhaps next to her second husband, who had been buried in the same place on 11 February 1657/8. Children of Robert Rugge and Constance Taylor:
 Thomas Rugge (1640–1668), gentleman and lord of Hardingham Hall in Norfolk. He may have been the Thomas Rugge who was admitted Fell.-Com at Caius, Cambridge, 1663, and gave the works of Paracelsus to the College Library. Thomas married Elizabeth Goldisborough (1641–1696+) of Brentwood, Essex, by allegation dated February 1663. According to An Essay Towards a Topographical History of the County of Norfolk: Launditch he died without issue in 1660, and the estate was divided amongst his three sisters and coheirs, and their children. But he must have been the Thomas Rugg Genr (generosus, gentleman) who was buried on 24 November 1668 at Hardingham, Norwich. Elizabeth, the widow of Thomas, was living in 1680. She married again to Henry Beecher, Esq. of the Inner Temple, by marriage license dated 10 July 1671. She still had an interest in Hardingham Hall. In fact, Elizabeth was still alive in 1696, and still protecting her interest in Hardingham Hall. Thomas Rugge, Gent. in or about 1660, mortgaged North Repps, with the manor of Hardingham, to Robert Clayton, Esq. afterwards a knight, and lord mayor of London. Children of Thomas Rugge and Elizabeth Goldisborough:
 Robert Rugge, baptised on 23 February 1665 at Hardingham
 Thomas Rugge, baptised on 3 March 1667 at Hardingham
 Elizabeth, baptised 21 July 1642 at Hardingham
 Maria, baptised 24 December 1643 at Hardingham
 William, buried 19 September 1641 at Northrepps. He matriculated from Corpus Christi, Cambridge at Lent 1629/30
 Elizabeth
 Henry Repps (b.1574), died without issue, admitted Fell.-Com. at age 17 at Caius, Cambridge, 7 October 1591. Born at Bylaugh, Norfolk. Went to school in Fakenham, Norfolk, with Mr. Ward. His father is referred to as William Rugge of Bylaugh, Esq., in 1587
 Muryell, died without issue, baptised on 24 June 1575 at Norwich
 Mary, died without issue
 Thomazine, a twin with Mary, m. Thomas Flowerdew of Hetherset in Norfolk
 Frances (died before 30 November 1631), who married, as his second wife, Edward Cromwell, 3rd Baron Cromwell and had three children
 Elizabeth, m. 1) Robert Tilney, Esq., of East Tudenham in Norfolk; 2) Christopher Layer, the son of Christopher Layer (1531–1600) of Norwich, merchant, burgess of Norwich, and briefly a Member of Parliament, and Barbara Steward, the daughter of Augustine Steward, mercer, alderman and Mayor of Norwich

Thomas Rugge, the diarist, was also of this family. His great-grandnephew the Reverend William Rugge, Rector of Buckland (16 May 1740 – 2 November 1786), had the same coat of arms as William Rugge, Bishop of Norwich. The Reverend William Rugge was the grandson of the nephew of the diarist, John Rugge (d.1720) of the Inner Temple, London and Stirtloe, Buckden in the county of Huntingdonshire, gentleman, and Elizabeth, daughter of Sir Robert Wright, Chief Justice of the King’s Bench. Their son William Rugge of Conduit Street, St. George Hanover Square, London, was the father not only of the Reverend, but of Mary Rugge (1752 – 22 February 1838) who married Sir Charles Price, 1st Baronet (1747 – 1818), merchant in the City of London, shipowner, Lord Mayor of London and politician, on 16 December 1773 at St. James's Church, Piccadilly. Through this marriage they were the ancestors of the Price, later Rugge-Price baronets, of Spring Grove.

The Rugge-Price baronets of Spring Grove are therefore direct descendants of this family.[T]he family now quarter the arms of Rugge and use the Rugge crest in addition to their ownFrom his monument in Buckland Church, the coat of arms of the Reverend William Rugge, Rector of Buckland is described as:Arms: Gules a chevron engrailed between three mullets pierced Argent.Of the arms of William Rugge, Bishop of Norwich, it is said:William Rugge, Esq. of Felmingham, is said to have changed his arms, per fess, sable and argent, and unicorn saliant, counterchanged, armed, mained and unguled or, to that of gules, a chevron engrailed, between three mullets pierced, argent; but Richard de Rugge, who lived in the 2d of Richard III. and the Bishop of Norwich, bore, as it appears, this last coat.

These two men shared one coat of arms: Gules, a chevron engrailed, between three mullets pierced, argent

Of this family was probably also the ship surgeon John Rugge (d.1761), surgeon of His Majesty's ship the Falmouth, who was buried in India on 2 June 1761. He leaves his entire estate to William Rugge of Conduit Street, Esquire, and appoints him sole executor.

Of this family was also the husband of Elnathan Rugge (d.1685), widow, of Buckden in Huntingdonshire, who mentions "my nephew John Rugg of Bugden". She gives him 'my silver tankard that hath his arms upon it' and a vast deal more.

The Rugge coat of arms can be seen on the monument of Francis Rugge (1535–1607), Mayor of Norwich at St. Andrew's Church in Norwich, though the chevron does not appear to be engrailed. Francis Blomefield, Rector of Fersfield in Norfolk, however, confirms this to be the coat of arms of Rugge in his An Essay Towards A Topographical History of the County of Norfolk: Volume 4, Containing the History of Norwich, Part II. The coat of arms of Rugge quarters, 1st, arg. a chevron ingrailed between six keys sab. 2d, arg. a chevron ingrailed sab. between three birds. 3d, Brome. There is a crescent for difference. The said quartered coats impale Aldrich, and there is a shield of Aldrich single.

Of the other coats of arms the Rugge coat of arms is quartered with, Argent, a chevron, between three birds (martlets), sable, appears to be the coat of arms of Elizabeth Wood, Francis Rugge's mother.

According to The Visitations of Norfolk the arms of Rugge were quartered with Argent, a chevron engrailed between three pairs of keys addorsed sable as early as in 1552. Edmund Farrer identifies this coat of arms as that of Mynshawe. This indicates a Rugge marriage to a Mynshawe heiress prior to that date.

Notes

1550 deaths
English Benedictines
English abbots
Benedictine abbots
Bishops of Norwich
Year of birth unknown
16th-century English theologians
16th-century English bishops
People from Northrepps
Alumni of Gonville and Caius College, Cambridge
English religious writers
16th-century English writers
16th-century male writers
English Roman Catholics
16th-century Roman Catholics